XCOM: Enemy Unknown is a 2012 turn-based tactical video game developed by Firaxis Games and published by 2K Games. The game is a "reimagined" remake of the 1994 cult classic strategy game X-COM: UFO Defense (also known as UFO: Enemy Unknown) and a reboot of MicroProse's 1990s X-COM series. Set in an alternative version of the year 2015, the player controls an elite multinational paramilitary organization called XCOM during an alien invasion of Earth. The player commands troops in the field in a series of turn-based tactical missions; between missions, the player directs the research and development of technologies from recovered alien technology and captured prisoners, expands XCOM's base of operations, manages finances, and monitors and responds to alien activity.

XCOM: Enemy Unknown was released for Microsoft Windows, PlayStation 3, and Xbox 360 in North America on October 9, 2012, and in Europe and Australia on October 12, 2012. An "Elite Edition", containing all previously released downloadable content, was released for Mac OS X by Feral Interactive in April 2013. A port for iOS was released in June 2013 and an Android conversion was released in April 2014. An expansion pack, titled XCOM: Enemy Within, was released in November 2013. In June 2014, Feral released both XCOM: Enemy Unknown and its expansion pack XCOM: Enemy Within for Linux. A bundle containing both Enemy Unknown and Enemy Within was launched on the PlayStation Store for PlayStation Vita in March 2016 under the title XCOM: Enemy Unknown Plus.

XCOM: Enemy Unknown was critically acclaimed, with several reviewers commenting on the game's difficulty, replayability, and addictiveness. A number of publications, including GameSpy, GameTrailers and Giant Bomb, named it Game of the Year, and it went on to be considered one of the greatest games ever made. A sequel to the game, titled XCOM 2, was released on February 5, 2016 for Microsoft Windows, OS X, and Linux.

Gameplay

Much like its predecessor, XCOM: Enemy Unknown casts the player as the commander of an elite military organization. As commander, the player directs their soldiers in turn-based combat missions against alien enemies. Between missions, the player directs the organization's research and engineering divisions in creating new technologies and improving XCOM's base of operations, and manages the organization's finances.

The turn-based ground combat uses a top-down 3D perspective. The player controls a squad of between one and six human soldiers or robotic units as they hunt the aliens on the map and attempt to complete other objectives dependent on the mission. Map layouts are not randomly generated, but enemy placement is. Fog of war hides the aliens and their actions from view until the player's soldiers are in range and have line of sight on them, and enemies normally do not act at all until the squad initially comes within line of sight. Soldiers can carry items and perform special abilities; use of these items and abilities is controlled through a toolbar on the head-up display (HUD). A few examples of abilities include firing on enemies automatically after they emerge, launching explosives, and healing allies.

Soldiers can take cover behind walls and objects in the environment to gain a measure of protection. Units can use suppressive fire to disadvantage enemies, and use active camouflage to maneuver around opponents. Cutscenes and dynamic camera movements emphasise particularly exciting gameplay moments, such as kill sequences and use of special abilities. The game includes some tactical role-playing elements, whereby the player's soldiers can gain abilities as they survive more battles.

The game's strategy element occurs between missions. XCOM's underground headquarters is presented in a view dubbed the "ant farm". From this view, the player manages construction, manufacturing and research projects underway, and directs how the scientists and engineers use resources recovered from missions and received from XCOM's sponsors. A holographic view of the Earth called the "Geoscape" allows the player to keep track of the situation around the world, ordering aircraft to intercept UFOs and dispatching soldiers to engage aliens on the ground.

This influences the panic level of XCOM's member nations. Responding to situations in certain areas decreases panic, and ignoring them results in a rise in panic and potential for the nation to pull out of XCOM. The "ant farm" also allows the player to observe the team of soldiers relaxing or exercising at the base's gym. A memorial wall to soldiers killed in action is also viewable. Passive bonuses are provided depending on which continent the player chooses for a base location. The player can better detect alien activity by launching satellites and positioning them over territories of interest.

The game can be played on higher difficulty levels: Classic (in a reference to the original game) and Impossible, each with the option to enable the "Ironman" option (which limits players to a single save file) separately for each. Jake Solomon, lead developer, stated on numerous occasions that he believes that the "truest XCOM experience" is playing without the ability to reload saved games. On the higher difficulty levels, the random nature of battles, where soldiers under the player's command can permanently die from one enemy attack, the against-all-odds nature of combat against the unknown and technologically superior enemy, and the requirement to sacrifice some resources – including soldiers and even entire countries – for the greater good combine to create a bleak atmosphere where the player feels the weight of command.

The game features a multiplayer mode for one-on-one tactical battles. Players spend a predefined points budget on assembling a squad of up to six humans, aliens, or a mixture of both. Human units are customizable in terms of weaponry, armor and gadgets. A simplified version of the single-player perk system is present. Alien units may not be customized but possess the abilities of corresponding aliens types in the single-player mode of the game.

Psionic combat from the original 1994 game is retained, but some gameplay features of the original have been removed or adapted. The time units system, the always-visible grid map and the inventory system of the original have been removed. The initial mission phase of disembarking from the transport has also been removed – missions now begin with troops deployed outside the craft. Unlike in the 1994 game, only one XCOM base exists, the location of which is chosen at the beginning of the game.

Although there are some differences in the interface between platforms, unlike other games such as Firaxis' Civilization Revolution, the content is not simplified for the console versions. The PC version features a mouse-driven UI.

Plot

Setting
The game's campaign begins in the spring of 2015, as a global alien invasion begins. Prior to the start of the game, a group of countries called the Council of Nations has banded together to create XCOM (short for Extraterrestrial Combat Unit), the most elite military and scientific organization in human history, tasked with defending them from the alien attack. The player assumes the role of the commander of XCOM, and proceeds to engage in a war against an extraterrestrial enemy with overwhelming technological superiority.

Story
In March 2015, a series of extraterrestrial objects land in a major German city. A squad of four soldiers is sent to investigate the incident. Upon entering a warehouse, the squad finds German soldiers being mind controlled by a small alien creature before being ambushed. All but one of the soldiers are killed before the area is secured. Alien attacks begin all over the globe.

After success with shooting down alien scout ships and securing the crash sites from surviving alien crews, as well as interdicting alien attempts to abduct human civilians for unknown purposes, XCOM manages to also obtain the corpses of various different alien troops. Autopsies reveal that all these types have been genetically and/or cybernetically altered, which seems to indicate they are merely foot-soldiers for unseen leaders. XCOM's head of research, Dr. Vahlen, requests that a live alien be captured for interrogation. This also involves developing a specialized weapon capable of capturing a live alien, and constructing a facility in XCOM's subterranean base capable of safely holding a live alien prisoner.

Capturing one of the alien troops and conducting the interrogation reveals vague information about another type of alien called the Outsiders, artificially-created crystalline beings encountered aboard UFOs, that appear to serve as pilots and navigators. Dr. Vahlen then requests that XCOM capture an Outsider for study. Upon capturing one of these, the examination reveals that the Outsiders' exotic crystalline structures behave in a manner similar to antennas, receiving a signal broadcast from a location buried underground on Earth. XCOM dispatches a team to investigate the signal; it is found to be coming from a base that the aliens have secretly established on Earth, where experiments are performed on abducted humans.

XCOM develops a method for gaining entry to the alien base and assaults it. During the mission, the alien serving as the base commander is discovered to have psychic abilities, but is nevertheless defeated by the soldiers. The commander's psychic communication device is recovered and reverse engineered. Tapping into the aliens' communications reveals a previously hidden, stealth "Overseer" UFO making rounds across the Earth. When the UFO is shot down, it is found to hold an alien species that had not been previously encountered, as well as a strange psionic artifact. The newly discovered species, called Ethereals, possess powerful psionic abilities.

Once the Overseer ship is shot down and the psionic artifact recovered, the massive enemy "Temple Ship" reveals itself in low Earth orbit over Brazil, and starts causing earthquakes even as far away as XCOM HQ. The reverse-engineering efforts enable XCOM to unlock and develop latent psionic powers that are present in certain human beings, thus enhancing their human soldiers. Out of these psychic human soldiers, the most powerful becomes the Volunteer, using the psionic artifact recovered from the Overseer UFO to tap into the aliens' psychic communication "hive", an experience that also increases his or her psionic strength. This allows them to attack and board the Temple Ship to seek out the Uber Ethereal, the leader of the alien invasion.

During the final battle aboard the ship, the Uber Ethereal reveals that, because of their own failure to improve their own race further, they have been testing and experimenting on other species throughout the universe in an attempt to identify a race worthy of being "Uplifted", searching for a race that is strong in both mind and body; the various species of alien troops that the player has encountered have all been failures in the Ethereals' experiments. By allowing humans to obtain their technology a few steps at a time, the Ethereals allowed humans to evolve to a fuller potential, and believe that humanity may be the culmination of their search, to find the perfect species to move on and prepare for "what lies ahead", a vaguely worded destiny that they do not describe further.

After slaying the Uber Ethereal, the Temple Ship begins to collapse into itself, creating a black hole, which would destroy the Earth due to its close proximity. While the psionically gifted Volunteer urges the other XCOM soldiers to rush back to their transport and escape the doomed ship, the Volunteer stays behind, using the psychic gift to take control of the ship and fly it further away from the planet, finally causing it to self-destruct and save Earth.

Development
XCOM: Enemy Unknown went into development in early 2008 as a "very, very big budget" project with about 50–60 team members led by Jake Solomon. Its prototype was a straightforward remake of the original 1994 game X-COM: UFO Defense  with all the classic gameplay features. The game subsequently went through many revisions, and features were added, tested or removed to create the final result.

XCOM: Enemy Unknown was developed independently of 2K Marin's XCOM (later rebranded as The Bureau: XCOM Declassified), and although the two games are set in different universes, the developers of the two games were in contact with one another. Enemy Unknown was the first title developed by Firaxis Games not to feature the name of Sid Meier, who served as the director of creative development but was not directly involved in the game's development day to day. The designers made an internal board game to help get the "feel" of the game right.

The interface team was split into halves to develop separate GUIs for the PC and console releases. All members of the development team played and finished the original Enemy Unknown game – they were required to do so if they had not already when they joined the team. Roland Rizzo, who has been working with the X-COM series since the beginning, became the audio lead for the game and was tasked with reimagining and updating John Broomhall's famous original music score. Michael McCann, composer for Deus Ex: Human Revolution, was involved in creating the game's musical score. The Civilization series' art director Greg Foertsch was given the task of reimagining the look of X-COM, including redesigning the classic alien species. The aim was to have the characters resemble action figures, and the result was a stylized, bright, flat-textured look.

Release
XCOM: Enemy Unknown was revealed on January 5, 2012 by Game Informer. A playable demo of the game was available at Electronic Entertainment Expo (E3) in June 2012. Pre-order bonuses included the "Classic X-COM Soldier" (a haircut for the player's male soldier based on the model for troops in the original 1994 X-COM) and the option to customize the aesthetic design of soldiers' armor. Those pre-ordering the PC version on Steam also received bonus items for Valve's Team Fortress 2 and a free copy of Firaxis' 2010 strategy game Civilization V. The game's playable demo version was released  on September 24, 2012 for Steam, on October 9 for Xbox Live and on October 10 for PlayStation Network.

Eight custom promotional XCOM: Enemy Unknown arcade cabinets were produced in August 2011 by 2K Games and Bespoke Arcades. The machines were used to run tournaments of the game at various exhibitions including i47, London MCM Expo, Play Expo and Eurogamer Expo with the machines being awarded as prizes.

XCOM: Enemy Unknown was released in stores on October 9, 2012 for North American consumers and on October 12, 2012 for Australian and European consumers. The game was released for digital distribution via Steam on October 9, 2012. On PC, two editions were released: a normal edition and a special edition which includes a variety of unique items, including an art book, a fold-out poster of the XCOM headquarters, an XCOM insignia patch, and a collection of digital bonus assets such as desktop wallpapers, soundtrack and more.

An "Elite Edition", containing all previously released DLC, was announced for Mac OS X by Feral Interactive on February 26, 2013 and was released on April 25, 2013. An iOS port, scheduled to be released in the summer of 2013, was announced during a PAX East panel on March 23, 2013. A version for Android was released on April 2014.

XCOM: Enemy Within

An expansion pack, XCOM: Enemy Within was released worldwide on Steam and in retail stores on November 15, 2013. The pack retains the core storyline but adds a broad variety of content, including new weapons, special missions and the ability to enhance soldiers via genetic engineering or cybernetic implants. Both of those options consume an elusive substance called "Meld" that can be obtained during battles.

Reception

Critical reception

XCOM: Enemy Unknown greatly impressed the public and media at E3 2012, where it won a number of awards from a variety of gaming publications, such as the title of "Best Strategy Game" from GameSpy, Game Informer, IGN, and Machinima. The game also won the titles "Best PC Game" and "Best Strategy Game" in the 2012 E3 Game Critics Awards.

A pre-release version of XCOM: Enemy Unknown received highly positive previews by, among others, PlayStation Official Magazine, Official Xbox Magazine and Rock, Paper, Shotgun. The full version of the game also received a high praise from critics. Adam Biessener of Game Informer called it "a singular achievement that every gamer deserves to experience." Ian Dransfield of Play called the game "a phenomenal reimagining of a classic title and an instant classic in its own right." It was described as "a hallmark of excellence" by Destructoid and "an exemplary turn-based strategy game" by Joystiq.

Dan Stapleton of GameSpy wrote: "I consider the 1994 turn-based tactical masterpiece X-COM: UFO Defense to be the single best videogame ever made. Compared directly to that impossibly high standard, Firaxis' 2012 remake, XCOM: Enemy Unknown, does remarkably well." GamesTM called it "a worthy reboot of the franchise, easily the most addictive game this year, and one of our favourite Firaxis games ever," with the final verdict of it being "fresh, yet authentic – a stunning reboot." Josh Harmon of Electronic Gaming Monthly (EGM) stated that "to say that XCOM: Enemy Unknown is a phenomenal remake would be selling Firaxis' monumental accomplishment short. The developer hasn't just managed to capture the spirit of the original; they've also tweaked, trimmed, and innovated enough to deliver the freshest, most engaging strategy game in recent memory, if not ever."

Eurogamer's review by Rich Stanton described XCOM: Enemy Unknown as "a winner" and "a fantastic game" that "brings back and revitalises a classic." Alex Rubens of G4 called it "an exceptionally solid return for the series, and one that every turn-based tactics fan should experience," adding that "even if you never played the original, XCOM: Enemy Unknown is turn-based tactics and management at its finest, and a perfect introduction to the genre."

David Houghton of Game Revolution said that despite its flaws, the game "feels like the revival of not just a brand, but a genre." Polygon's Russ Pitts criticized the "weird dichotomy" of the game's strategy component, but praised the tactical gameplay, calling it "one of the best and most artfully designed strategy games in recent memory." Edwin Evans-Thirlwell of Official Xbox Magazine stated that it "isn't just Xbox 360's finest strategy experience – it's also a strategy game which changes how you think about strategy games."

The game's difficulty received both praise and concern. G4's review noted that "the extreme difficulty of the game might not be welcomed by all players" and Official Xbox Magazine described the game as "reliably unforgiving". According to EGM, "XCOM hates you. XCOM wants you dead. And XCOM will see you dead, over and over again." Game Informer called it "one of the most challenging, intense gaming experiences of this generation." Plays review stated, "dying is back in fashion."

Several reviews commented on how addictive the game can be for the player. David Houghton of PlayStation Official Magazine called XCOM "one of the most unique and endlessly compulsive games of the year so far." Erik Kain of Forbes called it "one of the most addictive games I've ever played" that "falls somewhere between chocolate and crack on the scale of addictive substances." Allistair Pinsof of Destructoid, in pointing out how easily one could be absorbed in the game, told readers to "take the act of me wiping XCOM from my hard drive as high praise. It speaks volumes on how addictive and replayable XCOM is."

In a retrospective article about the original from 1994, Alec Meer of Eurogamer compared both games, coming to conclusion that "X-COM and XCOM are completely different games, both ingenious and both flawed in their own ways." According to Chris Schilling of VideoGamer.com, "Enemy Unknown is respectful of Julian Gollop's 1994 turn-based strategy classic, but it's not reverential." Charlie Hall of Ars Technica wrote that "in the end, this is not the X-COM that everyone was expecting. It's more. It's better. If you're merely looking for a highly competent re-skin of the original X-COM, keep your eyes peeled for the upcoming Xenonauts." Gollop himself said:

Awards
Multiple publications including Giant Bomb, Kotaku, MTV and GameTrailers gave XCOM: Enemy Unknown their overall Game of the Year award for 2012. GameSpy also gave XCOM its Game of the Year award ("Achievements: Game of the Year, High Tension, Making Turn-Based Cool Again"), commenting that "few games can deliver the thrill of victory and the agony of defeat in the way that XCOM does."

XCOM: Enemy Unknown was chosen by the 2012 Spike TV Video Game Awards as a nominee in the category Best PC Game. At the 16th Annual D.I.C.E. Awards, it was nominated for three awards, including "Game of the Year", and ended up winning two for 2012's "Strategy/Simulation Game of the Year" and "Outstanding Achievement in Gameplay Engineering". Awarding the game its title of Strategy Game of the Year, PC Gamer wrote it can be "forging player memories that'll live as long as you play and care about games."

Sequel

A sequel to XCOM: Enemy Unknown, XCOM 2, was released on February 5, 2016. It was developed by Firaxis Games and was released on Microsoft Windows, OS X and Linux. The game takes place 20 years after the events of Enemy Unknown, in an alternate scenario where XCOM failed to stop the alien invasion and humanity surrenders. The player controls a small resistance movement fighting against the alien conquerors.

See also
 The Dreamland Chronicles: Freedom Ridge – a previous attempt of a 3D remake of X-COM: UFO Defense by Julian Gollop.

References
Notes

Sources

External links
 
 

2012 video games
Alien invasions in video games
Android (operating system) games
Business simulation games
Construction and management simulation games
Feral Interactive games
Firaxis Games games
Interactive Achievement Award winners
IOS games
Linux games
Multiplayer and single-player video games
MacOS games
PlayStation 3 games
PlayStation Vita games
Science fiction video games
Tactical role-playing video games
Take-Two Interactive games
Terrorism in fiction
Turn-based tactics video games
Unreal Engine games
Video game reboots
Video game remakes
Video games developed in the United States
Video games scored by Michael McCann
Video games set in 2015
Video games set in Argentina
Video games set in Brazil
Video games set in Canada
Video games set in China
Video games set in France
Video games set in Germany
Video games set in Japan
Video games set in Kenya
Video games set in Mexico
Video games set in the United Kingdom
Video games set in the United States
Video games set in the 2010s
Video games with expansion packs
Windows games
XCOM
Xbox 360 games
BAFTA winners (video games)
Spike Video Game Award winners
D.I.C.E. Award for Strategy/Simulation Game of the Year winners
2K games